Andrew Mitchell (1879 – after 1899) was a Scottish footballer. An outside left, he first played for Albion Rovers before transferring to Woolwich Arsenal in 1898. He made his debut against Luton Town on 3 September 1898 and scored the winning goal in a 1–0 win. He played ten league games in 1898–99, but soon fell out of favour and left the club at the end of that season.

References

Scottish footballers
Albion Rovers F.C. players
Arsenal F.C. players
1879 births
Year of death missing
20th-century deaths
Date of birth missing
Place of birth missing
Place of death missing
Association football outside forwards